Neil Parry (born 8 November 1985) is a Scottish footballer who plays as a goalkeeper for Clyde.

Parry began his career at Stenhousemuir, before moving on to play for Junior clubs St Anthony's, Petershill and Arthurlie. In 2011 he returned to the Scottish Football League, where he has since played for Queen's Park, Albion Rovers, Airdrieonians, Alloa Athletic and Clyde.

Career
Parry began his career at career with Airdrie Boys Club, the youth team of Airdrie United. He then played one cup match as an emergency signing for Junior club Petershill before joining Stenhousemuir.

After leaving Stenhousemuir in 2005, Parry returned to the Juniors, firstly signing for St Anthony's then three months later, Petershill. In 2009, he moved to Arthurlie.

In May 2011, Parry returned to the senior leagues signing for Third Division club Queen's Park.

After two years at Queen's Park, Parry moved to Albion Rovers in May 2013. In his second season at Cliftonhill, the club won the 2014–15 Scottish League Two title and Parry was named in the PFA Scotland Scottish League Two Team of the Year.

On 30 May 2015, Parry signed for Airdrieonians. He left after only one season as the club "moved towards" full-time status, with Parry among a number of players leaving in order to stay part-time.

On 12 May 2016, Parry signed for Alloa Athletic. He combined his football career with a full-time job as a worker in the tax office in East Kilbride.

Parry left Alloa in August 2021 and signed for Clyde.

Career statistics

Honours

Club
Albion Rovers
Scottish League Two: 2014–15

Individual
PFA Scotland Scottish League Two Team of the Year: 2014–15

PFA Scotland Scottish League One Team of the Year: 2016–17, 2017–18

References

External links

1985 births
Living people
Sportspeople from Rutherglen
Scottish footballers
Association football goalkeepers
Stenhousemuir F.C. players
St Anthony's F.C. players
Arthurlie F.C. players
Petershill F.C. players
Queen's Park F.C. players
Albion Rovers F.C. players
Airdrieonians F.C. players
Alloa Athletic F.C. players
Scottish Junior Football Association players
Scottish Football League players
Scottish Professional Football League players
Clyde F.C. players
Footballers from South Lanarkshire